Kap-Kig-Iwan Provincial Park is a protected area in the incorporated townships of Charlton and Dack and Evanturel in Timiskaming District in Northeastern Ontario, Canada. Kap-Kig-Iwan is classified as a Natural Environment park and is a provincial park of Ontario.

Kap-Kig-Iwan has both electric and non-electric campsites. The park is often used by cross-country skiers during the winter months. Many of the trails double as ski trails.

References

Other map sources:

External links

Provincial parks of Ontario
Parks in Timiskaming District
Protected areas established in 1957
1957 establishments in Ontario